Daniel Francisco Barrera (born January 8, 1990) is a professional soccer player who plays as a midfielder for Hartford Athletic in the USL Championship. Born in Colombia, he has represented the United States at youth level.

Early life and education
Born in Bogotá, Colombia, Barrera moved to the United States at the age of eight, growing up in Thousand Oaks, California.  He trained with Sheffield United F.C. as a teen.  He developed his game in the United States both with the US Soccer residency program and at the high school level with Westlake High School, where he skipped his senior year of high school.  He was named as a Parade magazine All-American and regarded as one of the top recruits coming out of high school.  RiseMag.com listed Barrera as the #1 recruit in his class.

He attended the University of California, Santa Barbara where he was a student-athlete and played college soccer with the UC Santa Barbara Gauchos men's soccer team from 2008 to 2010.  He would appear for the team in 66 games, scoring 10 goals and adding 22 assists.  He left UCSB after his junior year to pursue a professional career.

Club career
While still attending college, Barrera played with the newly formed PDL team Ventura County Fusion in the summers, alongside his brother Diego Barrera.  For the 2009 PDL season, Barrera and Ventura County Fusion beat Chicago Fire Premier for the league championship.  Over 4 seasons, he appeared in 39 games for Ventura County, scoring 13 goals and 15 assists.

After being named to the 2011 PDL season All-League Team, Barrera signed with Serbian SuperLiga side FK Spartak Subotica (for sponsorship reasons the name was Spartak Zlatibor Voda that season) in August 2011 after a successful trial.  He made his debut for Spartak against FK Borac Čačak on December 10, 2011.

Ventura County Fusion
Barrera returned to the United States in 2012 and re-joined Ventura County Fusion and appeared in 6 games, but played for Cal FC in their historic 2012 Lamar Hunt U.S. Open Cup run coached by Eric Wynalda.

Atlanta Silverbacks
In July, Barrera signed with Atlanta Silverbacks.  He was the first signing of new Silverbacks head coach Eric Wynalda, who had just been appointed some days earlier.  Wynalda, who coached Barrera at Cal FC, had previously stated that he's wanted Barrera playing for his team since 2010 when he first saw Barrera playing in Santa Barbara.

Trial at Derby County
In August 2012, Barrera joined English Football League Championship side Derby County F.C. on trial, where he featured in preseason friendlies against Belper Town F.C., Chesterfield F.C., and Matlock Town F.C.  He would return to Atlanta after the trial proved unsuccessful.

San Antonio Scorpions
Barrera joined San Antonio Scorpions ahead of the 2014 North American Soccer League season.  He was traded later that season to Carolina RailHawks for César Elizondo.  At the conclusion of the season, Barrera re-joined Cal FC for their 2015 Lamar Hunt U.S. Open Cup run.

Sacramento Republic
Barrera joined Sacramento Republic FC in June 2015.  He was re-signed by Sacramento for the 2016 USL season.  Head coach Paul Buckle moved Barrera to a more central position in the midfield and made him the team's captain.

Fresno FC
Barrera transferred to USL side Fresno FC for the 2018 season on January 23, 2018.

Hartford Athletic

Barrera signed with Hartford Athletic on June 13, 2019. He led the team in assists despite just 17 games played for the 2019 season with four. He was re signed for the 2020 season and named team captain. During the 2020 season Barrera led the team in assists for the second year in a row and was named team MVP. Barrera re signed with Hartford for the 2021 season on November 30, 2020. In October 2021, Barrera was named to the USL Championship's All-Time Hispanic Team. Barrera recorded 12 assists during the 2021 season, the most of any player in the USL Championship.

Barrera re-signed with Hartford ahead of the 2022 season.

International career
When he was 17 he was a member of the USA team at the 2007 Pan-American Games being the youngest player of the roster. He also represented United States at U17 and U18 levels.

Honors
Individual
 USL All-League Team: 2016
 Hartford Athletic Team MVP 2020
 USL Championship's All-Time Hispanic Team

Personal life
Danny's older brother, Diego Barrera, is also a professional soccer player.  Barrera enjoys being able to experience other cultures through his soccer experiences and plans to be a coach after he retires. Barrera has a brief appearance and line in the Will Ferrell movie Kicking and Screaming as his coach Dan Metcalfe was also the movies soccer choreographer and used several of his youth players in the movie.

Barrera and his partner Vanessa have four children, Jacob, Addie and Dallas. The couples fourth child, Dakota Rae was born in February 2021.

References

External links

 Sacramento Republic FC player profile
 Carolina Railhawks player profile
 
 UC Santa Barbara player profile
 

1990 births
Living people
Footballers from Bogotá
Colombian emigrants to the United States
American soccer players
American expatriate soccer players
Footballers at the 2007 Pan American Games
Colombian footballers
Colombian expatriate footballers
Association football midfielders
Parade High School All-Americans (boys' soccer)
UC Santa Barbara Gauchos men's soccer players
Ventura County Fusion players
FK Spartak Subotica players
Cal FC players
Atlanta Silverbacks players
San Antonio Scorpions players
North Carolina FC players
Sacramento Republic FC players
Fresno FC players
Hartford Athletic players
Expatriate footballers in Serbia
American expatriate sportspeople in Serbia
USL League Two players
Serbian SuperLiga players
North American Soccer League players
USL Championship players
United States men's youth international soccer players
American sportspeople of Colombian descent
Sportspeople from Ventura County, California
United Premier Soccer League players
Pan American Games competitors for the United States